Audrey J. Walton Stadium on the campus of the University of Missouri is the home of the Missouri Tigers track and field teams and the Missouri Relays track and field meet. Audrey J. Walton, the namesake of the Stadium, was married to Sam Walton's brother, Bud Walton. Sam Walton is the founder of Wal-Mart and an alumnus of the university.  The stadium has a seating capacity of 2,500 and is also the home of the women's soccer team at the University of Missouri.

References

Sports venues in Missouri
Athletics (track and field) venues in Missouri
College track and field venues in the United States
Missouri Tigers track and field venues
Soccer venues in Missouri
University of Missouri campus
Sports venues in Columbia, Missouri
Buildings and structures in Columbia, Missouri
College soccer venues in the United States
1997 establishments in Missouri
Sports venues completed in 1997